Kev Adams or Kev' Adams (born Kevin Smadja; 1 July 1991) is a French comedian, actor, humorist, screenwriter and film producer.

Early life 
Adams was born in 1991 in the 16th district of Paris. His father is a real estate agent of Algerian Jewish descent and his mother, of Tunisian Jewish descent, works in finance. He has two younger brothers, Noam and Lirone. He began taking theater classes at the age of seven.
In 2009, Adams completed his French Baccalaureate in literature, and enrolled in law at the University of Paris X-Nanterre while simultaneously pursuing his acting career. He claimed that it was, "extremely difficult, nearly impossible, to balance both."

Career 
In 2009, Adams was spotted by Elisa Soussan, Anne Roumanoff's producer, who invited him to perform at her Carte Blanche show at the Olympia (Paris). This stage performance was broadcast on Paris Première. Following this event, Adams was offered to be the opening act of a Gad Elmaleh show at the Palais des Sports. His first one-man show, The Young Man Show, first ran in Paris in 2009 at the Théâtre Le Temple and then continued at the Palais des Glaces before touring France. The tour ended in Switzerland on 22 July 2012, during the Paléo Festival de Nyon. He then performed a show called Test... Voilà, Voilà! at the Bataclan from 27 November to 31 December 2013.

As of May 2014, Adams has more than 3 million fans on Facebook and more than 1 million followers on Twitter and in 2017 more 4 million followers on instagram.

From September 2010 to February 2011, Adams was a contestant on the TV program On n'demande qu'à en rire ("We just want to laugh at it", literally "We ask only to laugh at it") hosted by Laurent Ruquier. He left the show voluntarily to dedicate himself to the Soda television series, in which he plays a major role. Soda depicts the daily life of three boys and includes guest stars such as La Fouine and Amel Bent. Since the summer of 2011, the series has been broadcast on M6, and on W9 in 2012. Season three close the series in 2015.

The same year he has his biggest box office successes with Serial Teachers, as the almost-school dropout and his adventures with the worst teachers of France, and The New Adventures of Aladdin, as one of the thieves caught by the children in the midst of a robbery on Christmas Eve.

In 2018, he created the animated series Kev's World ("Le Monde selon Kev"). He also voiced himself in the original French version.

Filmography

Discography

References

External links

 

1991 births
Living people
Male actors from Paris
French humorists
French people of Algerian-Jewish descent
French people of Tunisian-Jewish descent
French male film actors
French male television actors
21st-century French male actors
French male screenwriters
French screenwriters
French film producers
French male comedians